The 45th Writers Guild of America Awards honored the best television, and film writers of 1992. Winners were announced in 1993.

Winners & Nominees

Film 
Winners are listed first highlighted in boldface.

Television

Documentary

Radio

Special Awards

References

External links 

 WGA.org

1992
W
1992 in American cinema
1992 in American television